Eva Barbara Novak (February 14, 1898 – April 17, 1988) was an American film actress, who was quite popular during the silent film era.

Biography
On February 14, 1898, Eva Barbara Novak was born in St. Louis, Missouri, to Joseph Jerome Novak, an immigrant from Bohemia, and Barbara Medek. Her older sister, Johana, also became an actress. Joseph Novak died when Eva was still a child and Barbara was left to raise five children.

Novak began her acting career in 1917 in L-KO's Roped into Scandal, followed by another seven films that same year. She appeared in 17 films in 1918, and another eight in 1919. In 1920, she starred opposite Tom Mix in The Daredevil, one of six film roles she would have that year, and one of ten films in which she starred opposite Mix.

In 1921, she married stuntman William Reed, whom she met while on location for a film. They had two daughters Vivian Barbara and Pamela Eve.

Novak was interested in stunt performing herself, having been taught by Mix to perform many of her own stunts. From 1921 to 1928, she appeared in and starred in 48 films, including an early version of Boston Blackie. She also co-starred with Betty Bronson and Jack Benny in The Medicine Man (1930) and appeared in the 1922 film Chasing the Moon, which was an early forerunner of the 1950s film D.O.A. In the late 1920s, she and her husband moved to Australia, where she made numerous films, including The Romance of Runnibede. However, with the advent of "talking films", her popularity faded. She would continue to act, but mostly in obscure roles.

She appeared in 123 films between 1917 and 1965, when she retired. She was residing in Woodland Hills, Los Angeles at the time of her death from pneumonia at the age of 90, on April 17, 1988.

In May 1923, the Altoona Tribune held a contest to find the girl who most closely resembled Novak. An announcement in the newspaper said that the winner would receive $250 worth of clothes from a store.

Selected filmography

 The King of the Kitchen (1918, short)
 The Freckled Fish (1919, short)
 The Speed Maniac (1919)
 The Feud (1919)
 Wanted at Headquarters (1920)
 The Daredevil (1920)
 The Testing Block (1920)
 Desert Love (1920)
 Up in Mary's Attic (1920)
 Silk Husbands and Calico Wives (1920)
 O'Malley of the Mounted (1921)
 Trailin' (1921)
 The Rough Diamond (1921)
 Society Secrets (1921)
 The Smart Sex (1921)
 The Torrent (1921)
 The Last Trail (1921)
 Wolves of the North (1921)
 The Man from Hell's River (1922)
 Sky High (1922)
 Chasing the Moon (1922)
 The Man Who Saw Tomorrow (1922)
 Making a Man (1922)
 Barriers of Folly (1922)
 Up and Going (1922)
 The Great Night (1922)
 The Tiger's Claw (1923)
 A Noise in Newboro (1923)
 The Man Life Passed By (1923)
 Boston Blackie (1923)
 Dollar Devils (1923)
 Temptation (1923)
 Missing Daughters (1924)
 Listen Lester (1924)
 The Beautiful Sinner (1924)
 The Fatal Mistake (1924)
 Racing for Life (1924)
A Fight for Honor (1924)
 Lure of the Yukon (1924)
 Tainted Money (1924)
 Women First (1924)
 Laughing at Danger (1924)
 The Triflers (1924)
 Safeguarded (1924)
 Battling Mason (1924)
The Fearless Lover (1925)
 Northern Code (1925)
 Sally (1925)
 Irene (1926)
 Say It with Babies (1926, short)
 The Millionaire Policeman (1926)
 The Dixie Flyer (1926)
 No Man's Gold (1926)
 30 Below Zero (1926)
 The Romance of Runnibede (1927)
 Red Signals (1927)
 Duty's Reward (1927)
 For the Term of His Natural Life (1927)
 The Romance of Runnibede (1928)
 The Medicine Man (1930)
 The Phantom of the Desert (1930)
 Dangerous Intrigue (1936)
 Ride a Crooked Mile  (1938)
 The Topeka Terror (1945)
 Apology for Murder (1945)
 Corpus Christi Bandits (1945)
 Three's a Crowd (1945)
 Claudia and David (1946)
 Blackmail (1947)
 Four Faces West (1948)
 3 Godfathers (1948)
 Havana Rose (1951)
 Sergeant Rutledge (1960)
 The Man Who Shot Liberty Valance (1962)
 Wild Seed (1965)

References

External links
 
 

1898 births
1988 deaths
American film actresses
American silent film actresses
Actresses from St. Louis
20th-century American actresses
Deaths from pneumonia in California
American people of Bohemian descent
American people of Czech descent